"I Don't Want to Have to Marry You" is a song written by Fred Imus and Phil Sweet, and recorded by American country music duo Jim Ed Brown and Helen Cornelius.

It was released in July 1976 as the first single and title track from the album I Don't Want to Have to Marry You.  It was the most successful single for both Jim Ed Brown and Helen Cornelius as both a duo and as solo artists.  The single was the only number one of their careers and stayed at number one for two weeks and spent a total of ten weeks on the country chart.

Chart performance

References

1976 singles
Helen Cornelius songs
Jim Ed Brown songs
Song recordings produced by Bob Ferguson (musician)
RCA Records singles
Male–female vocal duets